Crema Cathedral (Cattedrale di Santa Maria Assunta) is a Roman Catholic cathedral in Crema, northern Italy. Dedicated to the Assumption of the Virgin Mary, it is the seat of the Bishop of Crema.

History
The first cathedral in the town was destroyed by Frederick Barbarossa in 1160. A new building was begun in 1185, but construction was halted in 1212, not to begin again until 1284 but in Gothic style. The church was finished in 1340, with the addition in 1385 of a lengthened apse and a crypt.

The façade is in typical Lombard Gothic style, with a single portal surmounted, in the lunette, by sculptures of the Madonna and Child and Saints Pantaleon and John the Baptist over a frieze with the faces of saints. Over the portal is a large marble rose window, flanked by mullioned windows. The façade terminates in a loggia with small marble columns.

The bell tower, on the right side, dates to the 14th century, while the octagonal upper part is from the 17th century.

The Gothic interior has a nave and five aisles.

See also
Diocese of Crema

Sources
Page at medioevo.it 

Religious buildings and structures completed in 1340
14th-century Roman Catholic church buildings in Italy
Crema
Churches in the province of Cremona
Gothic architecture in Lombardy
Cathedrals in Lombardy